Election Commissioners of Bangladesh, publicly referred to as EC, are members of Bangladesh Election Commission, who are bestowed upon the responsibility to arrange and oversee the conduct of free and fair national and regional elections, empowered by the commission.

Article 118 of the Bangladeshi constitution instructs the state to organise an independent agency, which will be free of political and government influences, consisting of one Chief Election Commissioner and four more assisting Election Commissioners with direct approval of the state president.

Appointment and removal 
The appointment of the Chief Election Commissioner of Bangladesh and other Election Commissioners  is made by the president. The Chief Election Commissioner is to act as chairman of the Election Commission of Bangladesh. Under the Constitution the term of office of any Election Commissioner is five years from the date on which he enters upon office. A person who has held office as Chief Election Commissioner is not eligible for appointment in the service of the Republic. Any other Election Commissioner is, on ceasing to hold such office, eligible for appointment as Chief Election Commissioner, but is not eligible for appointment in the service of the Republic.

List

See also
Election Commission of Bangladesh
Chief Election Commissioner of Bangladesh
Elections in Bangladesh

References

Elections in Bangladesh
Election Commission of Bangladesh